(Ichimada Naoto) was a Japanese businessman, central banker and the 18th Governor of the Bank of Japan (BOJ). He headed the Japanese part of the fundraising operation to found International Christian University (he was a Buddhist however).

Early life
Ichimada was born in Oita Prefecture.

Career
Ichimada was Governor of the Bank of Japan from June 1, 1946 – December 10, 1954. Then, he served in the Cabinet of Japan as Minister of Finance twice, from 1954 to 1956 and again from 1957 to 1958.

Notes

References
Werner, Richard A. (2003). Princes of the Yen: Japan's Central Bankers and the Transformation of the Economy. Armonk, New York: M.E. Sharpe. ;  OCLC 471605161

|-

1893 births
1984 deaths
Ministers of Finance of Japan
Governors of the Bank of Japan
Japanese Buddhists
People from Ōita Prefecture